Parliamentary elections were held in Cape Verde on 7 December 1985. The country was a one-party state at the time, with the African Party for the Independence of Cape Verde (PAICV) as the sole legal party. The PAICV presented a list of 83 candidates to voters to approve. The list was approved by 94.0% of voters, with a turnout of 68.9%.

Its election campaign began on 18 November and finished a day before the elections on 7 December.

Results

References

External links
CAPE Verde Date of Elections: 7 December 1985

Cape Verde
Elections in Cape Verde
1985 in Cape Verde
One-party elections
Single-candidate elections
December 1985 events in Africa